Keith Thibodeaux may refer to:

Richard Keith (actor) (born Keith Thibodeaux, 1950), American musician and child actor
Keith Thibodeaux (American football) (born 1974), NFL cornerback

See also
Thibodeaux (surname)